The 2019 Canada Open (officially known as the Yonex Canada Open 2019 for sponsorship reasons) was a badminton tournament which took place at Markin-MacPhail Centre in Canada from 2 to 7 July 2019 and had a total purse of $75,000.

Tournament
The 2019 Canada Open was the third Super 100 tournament of the 2019 BWF World Tour and also part of the Canada Open championships, which has been held since 1957. This tournament was organized by the Badminton Alberta and sanctioned by the BWF and Badminton Canada.

Venue
This international tournament was held at Markin-MacPhail Centre in Calgary, Alberta, Canada.

Point distribution
Below is the point distribution table for each phase of the tournament based on the BWF points system for the BWF Tour Super 100 event.

Prize money
The total prize money for this tournament was US$75,000. Distribution of prize money was in accordance with BWF regulations.

Men's singles

Seeds

 Lee Dong-keun (second round)
 B. Sai Praneeth (withdrew)
 Prannoy H. S. (second round)
 Wang Tzu-wei (semi-finals)
 Rajiv Ouseph (quarter-finals)
 Parupalli Kashyap (final)
 Kazumasa Sakai (second round)
 Misha Zilberman (withdrew)

Finals

Top half

Section 1

Section 2

Bottom half

Section 3

Section 4

Women's singles

Seeds

 Michelle Li (quarter-finals)
 Saena Kawakami (second round)
 Kim Ga-eun (first round)
 Zhang Yiman (second round)
 An Se-young (champion)
 Kim Hyo-min (semi-finals)
 Beatriz Corrales (withdrew)
 Porntip Buranaprasertsuk (quarter-finals)

Finals

Top half

Section 1

Section 2

Bottom half

Section 3

Section 4

Men's doubles

Seeds

 Liao Min-chun / Su Ching-heng (second round)
 Lee Yang / Wang Chi-lin (quarter-finals)
 Lu Ching-yao /  Yang Po-han (semi-finals)
 Mohamad Arif Abdul Latif / Nur Mohd Azriyn Ayub (second round)
 Ko Sung-hyun / Shin Baek-cheol (quarter-finals)
 Jason Ho-Shue / Nyl Yakura (first round)
 Lee Yong-dae / Yoo Yeon-seong (second round)
 Mathias Boe / Mads Conrad-Petersen (champions)

Finals

Top half

Section 1

Section 2

Bottom half

Section 3

Section 4

Women's doubles

Seeds

Finals

Top half

Section 1

Section 2

Bottom half

Section 3

Section 4

Mixed doubles

Seeds

 Ben Lane / Jessica Pugh (quarter-finals)
 Thom Gicquel / Delphine Delrue (semi-finals)
 Joshua Hurlburt-Yu / Josephine Wu (quarter-finals)
 Wang Chi-lin / Cheng Chi-ya (second round)
 Mathias Christiansen / Alexandra Bøje (quarter-finals)
 Ronan Labar / Anne Tran (first round)
 Lu Ching-yao / Lee Chia-hsin (quarter-finals)
 Kim Won-ho / Baek Ha-na (withdrew)

Finals

Top half

Section 1

Section 2

Bottom half

Section 3

Section 4

References

External links
 Tournament Link
 Official Website

Canadian Open (badminton)
Canada Open
Canada Open
Sport in Calgary
Canada Open